The Media Armory, is a historic National Guard Armory located in Media, Delaware County, Pennsylvania built in 1908 for Company H of the 6th Infantry Regiment of the Pennsylvania National Guard.

History 
The original building was designed by Will Price and M H. McLanahan in 1908 as the Armory for Company H of the 6th Infantry Regiment of the Pennsylvania National Guard. The 2 story structure is primarily constructed of stone and steel and has a basement. The "structure's intended military use is expressed by its heavily buttressed walls, broken battlements, and low flanking towers," according to a plaque affixed to the building by the Media Borough Council in 1984. Company H served in Mexican Border Expedition, and re-designated as Company H, 111th Infantry, 28th Infantry Division, in France in World War I, and as Company M, in the South Pacific in World War II.

The armory was added to the National Register of Historic Places on December 22, 1989.

The entire building was renovated and restored in 2004. The upper level was converted to retail space and is currently occupied by the grocery store chain, Trader Joe's. Solar panels were added on the roof at that time.

Pennsylvania Veterans Museum
The Pennsylvania Veterans Museum opened in 2005 on Veterans Day in the basement level of the building. Exhibits include dioramas of the D-Day invasion and the Korean War, a mini-movie theater, military uniforms, weapons, photographs and oral histories of veterans' experiences.

See also
National Register of Historic Places listings in Delaware County, Pennsylvania

References

External links
Pennsylvania Veterans Museum - official site
WHYY Video "Pennsylvania Veterans Museum"

Installations of the United States Army National Guard
Pennsylvania National Guard
Armories on the National Register of Historic Places in Pennsylvania
Gothic Revival architecture in Pennsylvania
Infrastructure completed in 1908
Buildings and structures in Delaware County, Pennsylvania
National Register of Historic Places in Delaware County, Pennsylvania
1908 establishments in Pennsylvania
Trader Joe's